Timothy Wynn (born 19 July 1985) is a former Australian professional rugby league footballer for French club Toulouse Olympique in the Co-operative Championship. He is the son of Peter Wynn famous for his achievement at Parramatta Eels. Timothy Wynn started as a junior at the Parramatta Eels (New South Wales Cup and Jersey Flegg Cup) in 2007 and he also played at Seven Hills JCB (A grade). The next year, in 2008 at the Wentworthville Magpies in the Western suburbs of Sydney, in the Jim Beam Cup. He primarily plays as a second row.

References

External links
Toulouse Olympique profile
Parramatta Adviser: "French contract a Wynn win"

Living people
1985 births
Toulouse Olympique players
Australian rugby league players
Wentworthville Magpies players
Rugby league second-rows